Westhampton is a town in Hampshire County, Massachusetts, United States. The population was 1,622 at the 2020 census. It is part of the Springfield, Massachusetts Metropolitan Statistical Area.

History 
Westhampton was first settled in 1762. Originally part of Northampton, Westhampton was officially incorporated on September 29, 1778. The first town meeting was held on November 19, 1778, at which the Reverend Enoch Hale, brother of American spy Nathan Hale, was chosen to be the town's first minister

Westhampton is one of 8 "dry" towns in the Commonwealth, meaning that the sale of alcoholic beverages is prohibited within its boundaries.

The town is home to the five-town Hampshire Regional High School which serves the towns of Westhampton, Southampton, Williamsburg, Goshen, and Chesterfield.

Geography
Westhampton is bordered by Southampton to the south, Huntington to the west, Chesterfield to the northwest, Williamsburg to the northeast, Northampton to the east, and Easthampton to the southeast.

Massachusetts Route 66 is the sole state highway through the town, leading east  to Northampton and west  to Knightville in the town of Huntington.

Demographics

As of the census of 2000, there were 1,468 people, 542 households, and 422 families residing in the town. There were 623 housing units at an average density of 23.0 per square mile (8.9/km). The racial makeup of the town was 98.50% White, 0.34% Native American, 0.14% Asian, 0.27% from other races, and 0.75% from two or more races. Hispanic or Latino of any race were 0.54% of the population.

There were 542 households, out of which 34.3% had children under the age of 18 living with them, 69.0% were married couples living together, 5.9% had a female householder with no husband present, and 22.1% were non-families. 15.9% of all households were made up of individuals, and 5.2% had someone living alone who was 65 years of age or older. The average household size was 2.71 and the average family size was 3.07.

In the town, the population was spread out, with 25.4% under the age of 18, 5.0% from 18 to 24, 31.0% from 25 to 44, 29.4% from 45 to 64, and 9.2% who were 65 years of age or older. The median age was 40 years. For every 100 females, there were 98.4 males. For every 100 females age 18 and over, there were 97.3 males.

The median income for a household in the town was $60,089, and the median income for a family was $66,625. Males had a median income of $42,200 versus $35,809 for females. The per capita income for the town was $25,360. About 1.9% of families and 3.5% of the population were below the poverty line, including 4.0% of those under age 18 and 4.3% of those age 65 or over.

Voting in the 2008 presidential election was held at the Westhampton Town Hall. Of the 1,095 votes cast, 62% were for Sen. Barack Obama, in contrast to the 37% of votes that were cast for Sen. John McCain.

Notable people

 Adam Dutkiewicz, guitarist of metalcore band Killswitch Engage
 Mordicai Gerstein, children's book illustrator
 Sylvester Judd, Transcendentalist author of 1845's Margaret, friend of Ralph Waldo Emerson and Margaret Fuller

Notes

External links 
 Town of Westhampton official website
 MHC Survey Reconnaissance Town Report: Westhampton Massachusetts Historical Commission, 1982.

Towns in Hampshire County, Massachusetts
Springfield metropolitan area, Massachusetts
Towns in Massachusetts